Fujian University of Technology is a public university located in Fuzhou, Fujian, China.
The Chinese Ministry of Education established the university in 2002 by merging Fujian College of Architecture and Civil Engineering and Fujian Institute of Technology. The predecessor of both institutions was the noted "Fujian Gaogong" (Fujian Advanced Technological School) originating from “Canxia Jingshe” (Canxia Elementary Technological School), which was co-founded in 1896 by Lin Shu, an eminent Fujian scholar and translator and Chen Baochen, tutor of the last Chinese emperor Puyi during the Qing dynasty. The university abbreviation is FJUT.

Faculty Information 
FJUT currently has 24,128 full-time students. There are 18,890 undergraduate students of which 5,238 are collegiates. There are also 4,788 adult students.

The university has 1,350 staff. The faculty members comprise 697 of which 213 are professors and associate professors. The university has 3 campuses, known as Shanxi Campus, Cangshan Campus and Pudong Campus and occupies a total area of 40.5 ha (607 mu). Its new location in Fuzhou University District will occupy an area of 107 ha (1,608 mu). The university is equipped with adequate facilities for teaching and learning with a total of 47 laboratories, the total value of the teaching equipment amounting to 71,420,000 Yuan.

History
The timeline of the history of the university is:

University Structure
FJUT consists of 13 departments, 2 teaching divisions, a school for adults' further education and vocational education and a software professionals training base.

Electromechanical and Automation Department
Information Science and Engineering Department
Civil Engineering Department
Architecture and Urban Planning Department
Environment and Equipment Engineering Department
Economic Management Department
Modern Media Department
Jurisprudence Department
Mathematics and Physics Department
School of Humanities
Traffic and Transportation Department
Mechanic and automobile engineering Department
The two teaching divisions are Political Science Division and Physical Education Division.

References

External links
http://www.fjut.edu.cn/

Universities and colleges in Fujian
Educational institutions established in 2002
Educational institutions established in 1896
2002 establishments in China